Tadhg Mor mac Maelruanaidh was a fifth king of Moylurg.

Tadhg Mor is the first ruler of Moylurg for whom we have definite regnal dates. Compared to his father, grandfather, great-grandfather and great-great grandfather, he seems to have had a comparatively short reign. However, this may be simply because others names were left out, or a pedigree was mistaken (not for the first time) as a king-list.

References
 "Mac Dermot of Moylurg: The Story of a Connacht Family", Dermot Mac Dermot, 1996.
 http://www.macdermot.com/

Connachta
12th-century Irish monarchs
People from County Roscommon
MacDermot family